Stephen I (November 867 – 18 May 893) was the Ecumenical Patriarch of Constantinople from 886 to 893.

Born at Constantinople, Stephen was the son of Eudokia Ingerina and, officially, Emperor Basil I. However, at the time when he was conceived, Eudokia was the mistress of Emperor Michael III. Consequently, it is most probable that like his older brother Leo VI the Wise, Stephen was Michael's son.

Castrated by Basil I, Stephen became a monk and was designated for a career in the church since his childhood. In 886, his brother, the new Emperor Leo VI, dismissed the Patriarch Photios and appointed the 19-year-old Stephen as patriarch in his stead.

As patriarch, Stephen participated in the ceremonial reburial of Michael III by Leo VI in the imperial mausoleum attached to the Church of the Holy Apostles in Constantinople. There are no important events associated with Stephen's patriarchate and the patriarch, who acquired a reputation for piety, died in May 893 at the age of 25. His feast day in the Eastern Orthodox Church is on May 18.

References

Sources
 The Oxford Dictionary of Byzantium, Oxford University Press, 1991.

Stephen I of Constantinople
Stephen I of Constantinople
9th-century patriarchs of Constantinople
Byzantine saints of the Eastern Orthodox Church
Stephen I of Constantinople
9th-century Christian saints
Sons of Byzantine emperors